Stictoleptura is a genus of longhorn beetle in the family Cerambycidae.

Species

Species within this genus include:

 Stictoleptura antiqua (Vitali, 2005)
 Stictoleptura bartoniana (Cockerell, 1920)
 Stictoleptura benjamini (Sama, 1993)
 Stictoleptura canadensis (Olivier, 1795) – Red-shouldered Pine Borer
 Stictoleptura cardinalis (Daniel K. & Daniel J., 1898)
 Stictoleptura cordigera (Fueßlins, 1775)
 Stictoleptura deyrollei (Pic, 1895)
 Stictoleptura dichroa (Blanchard, 1871)
 Stictoleptura erythroptera (Hagenbach, 1822)
 Stictoleptura excisipes (Daniel K. & Daniel J., 1891)
 Stictoleptura fontenayi (Mulsant, 1839)
 Stictoleptura gladiatrix Sama, 2008
 Stictoleptura heydeni (Ganglbauer, 1888)
 Stictoleptura igai (Tamanuki, 1943)
 Stictoleptura ivoroberti Sama, 2010
 Stictoleptura oblongomaculata (Buquet, 1840)
 Stictoleptura ondreji (Sláma, 1993)
 Stictoleptura otini (Peyerimhoff, 1949)
 Stictoleptura palmi (Demelt, 1972)
 Stictoleptura picticornis (Reitter, 1885)
 Stictoleptura rubripennis (Pic, 1927)
 Stictoleptura rubra (Linnaeus, 1758) – Red-brown Longhorn Beetle
 Stictoleptura rufa (Brullé, 1832)
 Stictoleptura scutellata (Fabricius, 1781)
 Stictoleptura simplonica (Fairmaire, 1885)
 Stictoleptura slamai Sama, 2010
 Stictoleptura stragulata (Germar, 1824)
 Stictoleptura tangeriana (Tournier, 1875)
 Stictoleptura tripartita (Heyden, 1889)
 Stictoleptura trisignata (Fairmaire, 1852)
 Stictoleptura variicornis (Dalman, 1817)

References

 
Lepturinae
Taxa named by Thomas Lincoln Casey Jr.